Arthur Pyne O'Callaghan (1 March 1837 – 17 December 1930) was a 19th-century Member of Parliament from Canterbury, New Zealand.

He was born in Fermoy, Ireland, on 1 March 1837.

O'Callaghan died in Eketahuna on 17 December 1930, and was buried at Mangaoranga Eketahuna Cemetery.

References

1837 births
1930 deaths
19th-century New Zealand politicians
Irish emigrants to New Zealand (before 1923)
Members of the New Zealand House of Representatives
New Zealand MPs for South Island electorates
People from Fermoy
Politicians from County Cork